Mediatonic Limited is a British video game developer based in London. The company was founded in September 2005 by Brunel University students Dave Bailey and Paul Croft, releasing their first game, Snowman Salvage in December that year. Initially a work-for-hire studio for Flash games, Mediatonic has developed original games for other platforms, including Murder by Numbers and Fall Guys: Ultimate Knockout. As of June 2020, Mediatonic employs 230 people in four studios and is part of Tonic Games Group, which is a subsidiary of Epic Games since March 2021.

History 
Mediatonic was founded in September 2005 by friends Dave Bailey and Paul Croft, both aged 21 at the time, during their final year at Brunel University. They decided on the opening in a drunken conversation at the university's student union bar. With an office near the campus, they set up the company as a work-for-hire studio to create Flash games and sometimes skipped lectures to accept calls from clients. Snowman Salvage, a game that was part of Croft's dissertation, was Mediatonic's first release in December 2005.

PopCap Games, Big Fish Games and PlayFirst were early Mediatonic clients and, among others, Mediatonic produced Flash conversions of Bejeweled, Bookworm, Diner Dash and Poppit!. It also created Amateur Surgeon, an original game, for Adult Swim Games. Mediatonic was profitable enough in its first year that, following Bailey and Croft's graduation, the studio moved to a former government building in Westminster in February 2006 and hired ten employees. Other early games by Mediatonic included Meowcenaries, Gigolo Assassin, Must Eat Birds, and Monsters (Probably) Stole My Princess. Having reached 25 employees, Mediatonic moved to new offices near Covent Garden in February 2008.

In July 2009, Mediatonic opened a studio in Brighton to act as a digital media agency, later spun out into a company named Graphite. Mediatonic received funding from entrepreneurs Kelly Sumner, Ian Livingstone and Geoff Heath in April 2010, and from Frog Capital in January 2012. Pete Hickman, a former executive producer for Eidos Interactive, joined Mediatonic as its head of production in July 2011. Planning to double its 50-strong headcount, Mediatonic moved its London headquarters to Soho in May 2012. Mediatonic opened a Brighton development studio that October. According to Bailey, Mediatonic began giving original games and work-for-hire projects equal weight and the company grew as a result. It later branched out into publishing, opening The Irregular Corporation as a sister company in December 2015.

Mediatonic moved into Shell Mex House, London, in April 2017. In July, a five-person team was established in a co-working space in Madrid, and expanded into a proper office in July 2019. A sister development studio, Fortitude Games, was established in Guildford in 2018. Frog Capital sold its share in Mediatonic to Synova Capital, making a 7.4-times return on its investment. A fourth studio for Mediatonic in Leamington Spa was announced in February 2020. Also in early 2020, Mediatonic established its headquarters in an office above London Victoria station, although it went largely unused due to the COVID-19 pandemic causing the company to make employees work from home. Bailey and Croft established Tonic Games Group as a parent company for Mediatonic, The Irregular Corporation, and Fortitude Games, moving 35 employees to Tonic Games Group, while Mediatonic had a staff of 230. On 2 March 2021, Epic Games announced that it had acquired Tonic Games Group, including Mediatonic.

Games developed

References

External links 
 

2005 establishments in England
British companies established in 2005
Companies based in the City of Westminster
Epic Games
Video game companies established in 2005
Video game companies of the United Kingdom
Video game development companies